Bruinsmia styracoides is a large tree of tropical Asia in the family Styracaceae. The specific epithet  refers to the tree's resemblance to Styrax officinalis.

Description
The grey to grey-brown bark is smooth, fissuring with age. The calyx is cup-shaped with yellow corolla lobes.

Distribution and habitat
Bruinsmia styracoides grows naturally in Thailand, Sumatra, Java, Borneo, Mindanao, Sulawesi, the Maluku Islands and New Guinea.

References

Styracaceae
Trees of Thailand
Trees of Malesia
Trees of New Guinea
Taxa named by Jacob Gijsbert Boerlage